Dionysio Basco (born January 29, 1977) is an American film and television actor of Filipino heritage. His brothers Dante, Darion and Derek Basco are also actors, as is his niece Ella Jay.

Basco was born in Pittsburg, California. He is best known for his roles as Alberto "Al" Ramos on the NBC Saturday morning sitcom, City Guys and as Flip in the 2003 film, Biker Boyz.  Basco also played Marco Quito in the 1996 film Race the Sun, starring Halle Berry. His other credits include Biker Boyz alongside older brother Dante and The Debut alongside remaining family members Derek, Darion and Arianna. Most recently he was seen on the web series Pretty Dudes alongside Yoshi Sudarso and Beau Sia.

References

External links

1977 births
Living people
Male actors from California
American male actors of Filipino descent
American male child actors
American male film actors
American male television actors
People from Pittsburg, California
21st-century American male actors
20th-century American male actors
Orange County School of the Arts alumni